Limnaecia simplex is a moth in the family Cosmopterigidae. It is found in New Guinea.

References

Natural History Museum Lepidoptera generic names catalog

Limnaecia
Moths described in 1954
Moths of New Guinea
Taxa named by Alexey Diakonoff